State Road 651 (SR 651) is a  state highway in Pinellas County, Florida, that runs from U.S. Route 19 Alternate and Florida State Road 686 in southern Largo to Florida State Road 60 and County Road 375 in Clearwater. It is unsigned throughout, running concurrent with U.S. Route 19 Alternate for the first , then with Florida State Road 60 until its terminus.

Major intersections

References

External links

FDOT Map of Pine County (Including SR 651)

651
651